Benon Vahe Sevan (born December 18, 1937 Nicosia, Cyprus) was the head of the United Nations' Oil-for-Food Programme, established in 1996 and charged with preventing Iraq's government from using the proceeds from oil exports for anything but food, medicine and other items to benefit the civilian population.

Biography 

Born into an Armenian-Cypriot family in Cyprus, Sevan was educated at the prestigious Melkonian Educational Institute in Nicosia. He obtained a BA in History and Philosophy at Columbia College, New York City, and a further degree from the School of International and Public Affairs at Columbia University.

He joined the United Nations in 1965 and worked, among other places, for a U.N.-administered plebiscite in West Irian, as well as on issues related to prisoners of war in the Iran-Iraq conflict. From 1982 to March 1988 Sevan was Secretary of the United Nations Economic and Social Council (ECOSOC). In April 1988 he was appointed director and senior political advisor to the Secretary-General's representative on the Afghan conflict. In January 1991 the Secretary-General appointed him to head the Office coordinating humanitarian aid to Afghanistan. On April 15, 1992 as Afghan president Mohammad Najibullah readied his resignation amidst the collapse of his government, Sevan flew alone to Kabul to escort Najibullah into exile. However, as Najibullah approached the airport, his car was blocked by militia forces loyal to Abdul Rashid Dostum. Najibullah quickly backtracked into the city and took refuge at the Kabul UN compound (where he was to remain for the next four years, until the Taliban took control and killed him).

Later in July 1992 he was named Assistant Secretary-General in the UN Department of Political Affairs. But Sevan came to world attention as investigations began into the Oil-for-Food Programme. Sevan reportedly accepted bribes from Saddam Hussein in the form of oil vouchers, and allowed Saddam to garner $11 billion for military and other uses which violated the UN sanctions against his regime, even as Sevan tried to persuade the United Nations Security Council to make concessions to the Iraqi regime.

In August, 2003, in the Canal Hotel Bombing :
 aljazeera.com : he was wounded, said spokesperson Veronique Taveau.
 globalsecurity.org : he was wounded
 foxnews.com : Sevan was in the building, but was not hurt.

On 7 February 2005, United Nations Secretary-General Kofi Annan suspended Sevan and another UN official with pay ($1 per year plus benefits, including diplomatic immunity from prosecution) because of their roles in the fraud. On 8 August 2005, a UN-appointed panel, led by Paul Volcker, published a report on its investigation into the scandal. In the report the panel concluded that Sevan had accepted bribes from the former Iraqi regime and recommended that his UN immunity be lifted, to allow for a criminal investigation. Sevan had resigned from the UN on 7 August 2005, just one day before the report was due to be published.

In October 2005 it was reported he had fled the US and returned to his native Cyprus. The extradition treaty between the US and Cyprus does not require Cyprus to send Sevan to the US.

Sevan is married with one daughter.

References

External links
 Iraq; final report: Oil for Food Programme, 1996-2003; 2004 unesco.org
 
 
 
 Claudia Rosett. 'I am Not Running away': Meet Benon Sevan, the man at the center of the Oil for Food scandal April 3, 2006 Canada Free Press

1937 births
Living people
Cypriot diplomats
Cypriot politicians
People from Nicosia
Cypriot officials of the United Nations
United Nations Oil-for-Food scandal
Cypriot people of Armenian descent
School of International and Public Affairs, Columbia University alumni
Cypriot emigrants to the United States